The Alcoholism Treatment Quarterly is a quarterly peer-reviewed medical journal published by Taylor & Francis. The editor-in-chief is Thomas F. McGovern (Texas Tech University). The journal was first published in 1984 by Haworth Press. It covers all aspects of alcohol addiction and its treatment.

Abstracting and indexing 
The journal is abstracted and indexed in:

References

External links 
 

Taylor & Francis academic journals
English-language journals
Quarterly journals
Addiction medicine journals